Levanga Hokkaido is a Japanese professional basketball team based in the city of Sapporo on the island of Hokkaido.
The club was founded in 2006 as Rera Kamuy Hokkaido, this name comes from the language of the Ainu, an ethnic group indigenous to Hokkaido, and means "god of the winds".  The franchise changed its name twice in 2011; the first when the club's parent company was kicked out of the league due to financial woes in the season. The team ended the season with a league-backed management group and a new moniker, calling itself Basketball Club Hokkaido. And finally, took its current name Levanga Hokkaido, in August 2011.

The team debuted in the Japan Basketball League in the 2007–2008 season and is one of only three teams in the league not owned by a major Japanese manufacturing company.

Levanga plays its home games mainly at the Hokkai Kitayell, but, as the team represents the entire Hokkaido Prefecture, also plays some home-games at the Asahikawa City General Gymnasium, Otaru City Gymnasium, Hakodate Arena, Obihiro City General Gymnasium & Kushiro Shitsugen no Kaze Arena.

The club was 200 million yen in debt in March 2017, but has since paid it off.

Honours

Continental
ABA Club Championship
Runner-up: 2008

Roster

Notable players
To appear in this section a player must have either:
- Set a club record or won an individual award as a professional player.
- Played at least one official international match for his senior national team or one NBA game at any time.

Coaches
Tomoya Higashino
Joe Bryant (2010–11)
Yoshinori Kaneta
Torsten Loibl
Scott Berry
Juan Manuel Hurtado Pérez (2013–14)
Kota Mizuno
José Neto
Tomohide Utsumi
Yuta Miyanaga
Kenichi Sako

Average regular season home game attendance

Practice facilities

Sapporo Shinyo High School Gymnasium
 Kaminishi Village Court

References

External links

Official Website
Team Profile

 
Basketball teams in Japan
Basketball teams established in 2006
Sports teams in Sapporo
2006 establishments in Japan